Carlo Giuseppe Ratti (1737–1795) was an Italian art biographer and painter of the late-Baroque period. He was a pupil of the painter Giovanni Agostino Ratti. Born in Savona, he moved to Rome where he befriended Anton Raphael Mengs and Pompeo Batoni. He died in Genoa, where he labored for many years.

He added to Raffaele Soprani’s history of Genoese painters: Vite de' pittori, scultori ed architetti genovesi first published in 1769 in Genoa. He painted an Annunciation for the church of Santa Maria delle Vigne in Genoa. He also published  A Life of Rafael Mengs, and Notices of Correggio. He corresponded with Luigi Lanzi, providing information regarding the artworks and painters in Liguria for Lanzi's Storia Pittorica dell'Italia. He was knighted by Pope Pius VI and made director of the Accademia Ligustica di Belle Arti.

One of his pupils was the portraitist Raimondo Ghelli.

Works
Writings:
 Storia de' pittori scultori et architetti liguri e de' forestieri che in Genova operarono (1762)

 Notizie Storiche Sincere Intorno La Vita E Le Opere Del Celebre Pittore Antonio Allegri Da Correggio (1781)
 Epilogo della vita del su cavalier Antonio Raffaello Mengs, primo pittor di Camera de Sua Maesta Cattolica (1779)

Paintings:
 Birth of the Virgin, Church of San Giovanni Battista, Savona
 Scenes from the Life of Saints Peter and Catherine, (1782) Oratory of Santissimi Pietro e Caterina, Savona
 Decorations in Sala Minore of the Consiglio of Ducal Palace, Genoa
 Hercules and Cacus e Ercole vince Atlante, Palazzo Rosso
 Annunciation and Trinità e Santi, Basilica of Santa Maria delle Vigne, Genoa
 Scenes from the Life of St Antony Abbott, Oratory of Sant'Antonio Abate, Mele
 Nativity, Commenda di San Giovanni di Pré

References

 Carlo Giuseppe Ratti. Storia de' pittori scultori et architetti liguri e de' forestieri che in Genova operarono, secondo il manoscritto del 1762, a cura di Maurizia Migliorini, Genova 1997
 
 

1737 births
1795 deaths
People from Savona
18th-century Italian painters
Italian male painters
Painters from Genoa
Italian art historians
Italian Baroque painters
Italian neoclassical painters
Academic staff of the Accademia Ligustica di Belle Arti
18th-century Italian male artists